The BMW 02 Series  is a range of compact executive cars produced by German automaker BMW between 1966 and 1977, based on a shortened version of the New Class Sedans.

The first 02 Series produced was the 1600-2 (later renamed 1602) in 1966. In 1975, the 02 Series was replaced by the E21 3 Series (except for the 1502 model which continued until 1977).

Overview 
The 1600-2, as the first "02 Series" BMW was designated, was an entry-level BMW, and was smaller, less expensive, and less well-appointed than the New Class Sedan on which it was based. BMW's design director Wilhelm Hofmeister assigned the two-door project to staff designers Georg Bertram and Manfred Rennen. With 5 cm (2 in) shorter wheelbase and some 25 cm (10 in) shorter in length, mainly by shortening the rear deck, the lighter weight of the two-door made it more suitable than the original New Class sedan for sporting purposes. As a result, the two door sedan became the basis of the sporting 02 Series.

Beginning in 1967, a convertible based on the 02 body was built by Karosserie Baur. The original design was a full convertible; after 1971 this was replaced by a targa-top model with fixed window frames called a "top cabriolet" (commonly referred to as a cabrio coach). A hatchback, called the Touring model, was developed from the 02 body, being available from 1971. Only 25,827 Touring models were sold before the bodystyle was discontinued in 1974.

At the Paris Motor Show in 1969, BMW unveiled a fastback 2002 GT4 concept car. This model never reached production.

1600-2 / 1602 
The 1600-2 (the "-2" meaning "2-door") made its debut at the Geneva Motor Show in March 1966 and was sold through 1975, with the designation being simplified to "1602" in 1971. The badging on the 1600-2 read simply "1600". In 1968, Road & Track declared the US$2676 1600 "a great automobile for the price".

A high performance version, the 1600 TI, was introduced in September 1967. With a compression ratio of 9.5:1 and the dual Solex PHH side-draft carburettor system from the 1800 TI, the 1600 TI produced  at 6,000 rpm. Once the 2002 arrived, the 1600 TI was immediately discontinued.

The 1600 TI was not sold in the United States, as it did not meet its emission standards.

Also introduced in September 1967 was a limited-production cabriolet, which would be produced by Baur from 1967 through 1971. A hatchback 1600 Touring model was introduced in 1971 but was discontinued in 1972.

2002 

Helmut Werner Bönsch, BMW's director of product planning, and Alex von Falkenhausen, designer of the M10 engine, each had a two-litre engine installed in a 1600-2 for their respective personal use. When they realized they had both made the same modification to their own cars, they prepared a joint proposal to BMW's board to manufacture a two-litre version of the 1600-2. At the same time, American importer Max Hoffman was asking BMW for a sporting version of the 02 series that could be sold in the United States.

As per the larger coupe and 4-door sedan models, the 2.0 engine was sold in two states of tune: the base single-carburetor 2002 producing  and the dual-carburetor high compression 2002 ti producing . The 2002 Automatic, with the base engine and a ZF 3HP12 3 speed automatic transmission, became available in 1969.

In 1971, the Baur cabriolet was switched from the 1.6 L engine to the 2.0 L engine to become the 2002 TopCabriolet, a cabrio coach with a large rollbar and fixed window frames which continued to be available well into 1975. In 1978 Baur presented a TopCabriolet version of the succeeding 3-series as well. The Touring version of the 02 Series became available with all engine sizes at the time, including the 2002 tii (of which only 422 examples were made) as the replacement for the 2002 ti. A 2002 tii Touring model was available throughout the run of the tii engine and the Touring body, both of which ended production in 1974.

The 2002 turbo (E20) was launched at the 1973 Frankfurt Motor Show. This was Europe's and BMW's first turbocharged production car. The car had a top speed of 211 km/h (131 mph). The 2002 Turbo used the 2002 tii engine with a twin-scroll 0.55 Bar turbocharger developed together with KK&K. The cylinder head was a modified version of the '121TI' design (used on 1972 & earlier 2002s) with larger combustion chambers to give a compression ratio of 6.9:1, in order to prevent engine knocking. A version of the Kugelfischer mechanical fuel injection was used with integrated boost enrichment feature and altitude compensation. The car had a larger radiator and an oil cooler as standard, front brakes were a ventilated derivative of the tii brake and rear drums were a 250mm design that would later appear on the E21 3-series. Gearbox was either a strengthened Getrag 232 4-speed (unique to the 2002 turbo) or the Getrag 235/5 close-ratio 5 speed (which was also optional on 2002 tii), this drove through a 3.36:1 limited slip differential to 5.5J13 steel wheels of a similar design to those that would appear later on the E21 The interior added an extra gauge cluster for the boost gauge & clock plus a red instrument panel with 240kmh/150 mph speedometer, sports seats & steering wheel. The steel body featured a different front-panel with additional tow-bracket and air-intake apertures and the front & rear wheel arches are cut-back to allow fitting of wider wheels. These body changes are clothed in fibreglass wheelarch extensions and a front airdam, all bolted to the body, plus a rubber rear spoiler on the trunk lid. Two standard colours were available:  Chamonix (white) and Polaris (silver) - and cars featured BMW motorsport colour-scheme stripes/decals on the sides & front airdam. The 2002 Turbo was introduced just before the 1973 oil crisis, therefore only 1,672 were built, as BMW has since said "BMW had built a car that contradicted the spirit of the times like no automobile before".

1802 

The 1802 was introduced in 1971 and was available with either the original 2-door sedan body or the 3-door Touring hatchback introduced that year. Production of the Touring model continued until 1974, with the 1802 sedan ending production the following year.

1502 
This engine had a lower compression ratio of 8.0:1, therefore standard-octane petrol could be used. While the rest of the 02 Series was replaced in 1975 by the E21 3 Series, the 1502 continued until 1977.

Model year changes

1968 January 
BMW 2002 (non USA) production begins with VIN 1650001.

1968 February 
US-specific 2002 production begins with VIN 1660001. A few early production models were actually assembled the previous fall for emissions testing and as press pool cars.  Approximately 2850 were built by the end of the model year production in Sept 1968. These models complied with US DOT and EPA regulations in place as of 1 January 1968.

1971 facelift 
In 1971, the 02 Series received a facelift. The 3-door hatchback "Touring" body style (badged "2000" initially) and the 1802 model were introduced as part of the facelift, and the 2002ti was replaced by the 2002tii. Other changes included wraparound bumpers for all models, a 2-piece instrument cluster and new seats.

1973 

Exterior trim changes, including revised tail-lights (except for Touring models and in the United States, which maintained round tail lights, US models received the revisions for the 1974 model year), grille and kidney trim.

1975 
The 1502 is introduced as the base model.

Special models

2002 ti Diana 
To celebrate the marriage of racer Hubert Hahne to Diana Körner, twelve custom 2002 ti models were built with changes including twin headlights (from the 2800 CS) a leather interior and Italian aluminium wheels. Each of the twelve cars were painted in a different colour. There are only four known remaining 2002 ti Diana.

1602 Elektro 

For the 1972 Olympic Games, BMW developed the "1602 Elektro" electric-powered concept vehicle. Two vehicles were produced, and they served as a support vehicle of the long-distance walkers and marathon runners during the games.

2002 GT4 
A special Frua-designed coupe body was developed on the basis of a 2002 Ti. Only two were produced in 1969/1970.

Production figures

Motorsport 
The Racing Sportscars database shows the BMW 2002 was used in competitive motorsport from 1968 to 1986, and 2002's were entered in 600 events. There were 2449 entries of cars at these 600 events, with 1520 finishes and 707 retirements (a finishing ratio of 68%).
Overall event wins totaled 50 (with additional 53 class wins), 57 2nd places and 62 3rd-place finishes.

Dieter Quester & Hubert Hahne won the June 1969 European Touring Car Race (ETCC) at Brand's Hatch, Kent, UK in a BMW 2002 TiK (the ~250BHP turbocharged factory-developed 2002 touring car)

The BMW 2002 competed in the Trans Am Series under two liter class, although it saw little success as the class was dominated by Alfa Romeo, Porsche, and Datsun. In the golden age of Trans Am (1966–1972), BMW only garnered two race wins (Bryar and Bridgehampton in 1970).

Hans-Joachim Stuck and Clemens Schickentanz won the inaugural 1970 24 Hours Nürburgring driving a 2002.

Homages 
In 2015, BMW introduced a pair of concept cars paying tribute to the BMW 2002 turbo: the 2002 Hommage Concept and the 2002 Hommage Turbomeister Concept.

References

External links 
 

1970s cars
02 Series
Cars introduced in 1966
Coupés
Rear-wheel-drive vehicles
Sports sedans